Botez is a Romanian surname. It means baptism. Notable people with the surname include:

People

Arts
 Demostene Botez (1893–1973), Romanian poet and writer
 Eugeniu Botez (1874–1933), Romanian novelist
 Manya Botez (1896–1971), Romanian pianist and piano teacher
 Oana Botez, Romanian-American costume designer for theatre, opera etc. 
 Octav Botez (1884–1943), Romanian literary historian and academic

Sports and games
 Andrea Botez (born 2002), Canadian chess player, born to Romanian parents
 Alexandra Botez (born 1995), American-Canadian chess player, born to Romanian parents
 Dumitru Botez (born 1973), Romanian footballer 
 Eugen Botez (1970–1971), Romanian canoeist
 Mihai Botez (gymnast) (1922–2011), Romanian gymnast

Other people
 Calypso Botez (1880–1933), Romanian women's rights activist
 Mihai Botez (mathematician) (1940–1995), a Romanian mathematician and political dissident
 Mihai Ioan Botez (1927–1998), Romanian neurologist 
 Ruxandra Botez (born 1960), Romanian aerospace engineering professor

Other
 Botez, a village in Ațintiș Commune, Mureș County, Romania 

Romanian-language surnames